Margaret Foster Richardson (December 19, 1881–1945) was an American painter known for her self-portraiture. Richardson is best known for her 1912 painting, Self-Portrait, A Motion Picture.

Early life and education 
Richardson was born in Winnetka, Illinois. She moved to Boston as a youth, where she studied art at the School of the Museum of Fine Arts. She graduated from the Normal Art School in 1905, where she studied under Joseph DeCamp and Edmund C. Tarbell.

Career 
Richardson exhibited art at Pennsylvania Academy of the Fine Arts in Philadelphia, the Corcoran Gallery of Art in Washington, D.C., the National Academy of Design in New York City, the Art Institute of Chicago, and the Carnegie Institute in Pittsburgh.

In Richardson's Self-Portrait, A Motion Picture, she painted herself in action, prepared to paint. As one critic observed, "She's striding forward at full tilt, brushes in both hands, looking as if she can't wait to attack the canvas. Her expression is one of gusto and almost missionary zeal. Hers is a self- portrait you might back away from." Another scholar remarked that the portrait "effaces many of the contemporary markers of femininity" to portray a more modern New Woman.

References

External links
Women in the Act of Painting posted by Nancy Bea Miller

1881 births
1945 deaths
20th-century American painters
American portrait painters
American women painters
Artists from Boston
Massachusetts College of Art and Design alumni
School of the Museum of Fine Arts at Tufts alumni
20th-century American women artists
Painters from Massachusetts
People from Winnetka, Illinois
Painters from Illinois